ODF is the OpenDocument format, a standard for electronic office documents.

ODF may also refer to:

Computing
 OpenDocument Foundation, a defunct organization which had some interest in OpenDocument and alternative formats
 Optical distribution frame, a distribution frame device to terminate optical fiber cables

Other uses
 Oregon Department of Forestry, a government agency in the U.S.
 Ombudsman for the Defence Forces, independent investigative military body in Ireland
 Open defecation free, a state of a village or community which has basic sanitation
 Operation Deep Freeze, a series of U.S. missions in Antarctica
 Orientation distribution function, in material science, a mathematical function for determining texture
 Osteoclast differentiation factor, in molecular biology, a signaling protein
 Open Dialogue Foundation, a human rights NGO in Poland